Uloborus is a spider genus in the family Uloboridae with 80 described species. Most species occur in the tropics and subtropics, with only few species in northern America and Europe.

The chelicerae of these cribellate spiders are robust, but, as all Uloboridae, there are no venom glands. Eight small eyes are present.

Species

 Uloborus albescens O. P-Cambridge, 1885 (Yarkand)
 Uloborus albofasciatus Chrysanthus, 1967 (New Guinea)
 Uloborus albolineatus Mello-Leitão, 1941 (Argentina)
 Uloborus ater Mello-Leitão, 1917 (Brazil)
 Uloborus aureus Vinson, 1863 (Madagascar)
 Uloborus barbipes L. Koch, 1872 (Queensland)
 Uloborus berlandi Roewer, 1951 (Guinea)
 Uloborus biconicus Yin & Hu, 2012 (China)
 Uloborus bigibbosus Simon, 1905 (India)
 Uloborus bispiralis Opell, 1982 (New Guinea)
 Uloborus campestratus Simon, 1893 (United States to Venezuela)
 Uloborus canescens C. L. Koch, 1844 (Colombia)
 Uloborus canus Macleay, 1827 (Australia)
 Uloborus cellarius Yin & Yan, 2012 (China)
 Uloborus chinmoyiae Biswas & Raychaudhuri, 2013 (Bangladesh)
 Uloborus conus Opell, 1982 (New Guinea)
 Uloborus crucifaciens Hingston, 1927 (Myanmar)
 Uloborus cubicus (Thorell, 1898) (Myanmar)
 Uloborus danolius Tikader, 1969 (India, Nicobar Islands)
 Uloborus diversus Marx, 1898 (USA, Mexico)
 Uloborus eberhardi Opell, 1981 (Costa Rica)
 Uloborus elongatus Opell, 1982 (Argentina)
 Uloborus emarginatus Kulczynski, 1908 (Java)
 Uloborus ferokus Bradoo, 1979 (India)
 Uloborus filidentatus Hingston, 1932 (Guyana)
 Uloborus filifaciens Hingston, 1927 (Andaman Islands)
 Uloborus filinodatus Hingston, 1932 (Guyana)
 Uloborus formosus Marx, 1898 (Mexico)
 Uloborus furunculus Simon, 1906 (India)
 Uloborus gilvus (Blackwall, 1870) (Italy, Greece)
 Uloborus glomosus (Walckenaer, 1842) (USA, Canada)
 Uloborus guangxiensis Zhu, Sha & Chen, 1989 (China)
 Uloborus humeralis Hasselt, 1882 (Myanmar, Sumatra, Java)
 Uloborus humeralis marginatus Kulczyński, 1908 (Java)
 Uloborus inaequalis Kulczyński, 1908 (New Guinea)
 Uloborus jabalpurensis Bhandari & Gajbe, 2001 (India)
 Uloborus jarrei Berland & Millot, 1940 (Guinea)
 Uloborus kerevatensis Opell, 1991 (New Guinea)
 Uloborus khasiensis Tikader, 1969 (India)
 Uloborus krishnae Tikader, 1970 (India, Nicobar Is.)
 Uloborus leucosagma Thorell, 1895 (Myanmar)
 Uloborus limbatus Thorell, 1895 (Myanmar)
 Uloborus llastay Grismado, 2002 (Argentina)
 Uloborus lugubris (Thorell, 1895) (Myanmar)
 Uloborus metae Opell, 1981 (Colombia)
 Uloborus minutus Mello-Leitão, 1915 (Brazil)
 Uloborus modestus Thorell, 1891 (Nicobar Is.)
 Uloborus montifer Marples, 1955 (Samoa)
 Uloborus niger Mello-Leitão, 1917 (Brazil)
 Uloborus oculatus Kulczyński, 1908 (Singapore)
 Uloborus parvulus Schmidt, 1976 (Canary Islands)
 Uloborus penicillatoides Xian et al., 1997 (China)
 Uloborus pictus Thorell, 1898 (Myanmar)
 Uloborus pinnipes Thorell, 1877 (Sulawesi)
 Uloborus planipedius Simon, 1896 (East, South Africa)
 Uloborus plumipes Lucas, 1846 (Old World)
 Uloborus plumipes javanus Kulczyński, 1908 (Java)
 Uloborus plumosus Schmidt, 1956 (Guinea)
 Uloborus pteropus (Thorell, 1887) (Myanmar)
 Uloborus rufus Schmidt & Krause, 1995 (Cape Verde Is.)
 Uloborus scutifaciens Hingston, 1927 (Myanmar)
 Uloborus segregatus Gertsch, 1936 (USA to Colombia)
 Uloborus sexfasciatus Simon, 1893 (Philippines)
 Uloborus shendurneyensis Asima, Sudhikumar & Prasad, 2021 (India)
 Uloborus spelaeus Bristowe, 1952 (Malaysia)
 Uloborus strandi (Caporiacco, 1940) (Ethiopia)
 Uloborus tenuissimus L. Koch, 1872 (Samoa)
 Uloborus tetramaculatus Mello-Leitão, 1940 (Brazil)
 Uloborus trifasciatus Thorell, 1890 (Sunda Islands)
 Uloborus trilineatus Keyserling, 1883 (Mexico to Paraguay)
 Uloborus umboniger Kulczyński, 1908 (Sri Lanka)
 Uloborus undulatus Thorell, 1878 (Java to New Guinea)
 Uloborus undulatus indicus Kulczyński, 1908 (Malaysia)
 Uloborus undulatus obscurior Kulczyński, 1908 (New Guinea)
 Uloborus undulatus pallidior Kulczyński, 1908 (Java to New Guinea)
 Uloborus vanillarum Vinson, 1863 (Madagascar)
 Uloborus velutinus Butler, 1882 (Madagascar)
 Uloborus villosus Keyserling, 1881 (Colombia)
 Uloborus viridimicans Simon, 1893 (Philippines)
 Uloborus walckenaerius Latreille, 1806  (Palearctic)

References 

Uloboridae
Araneomorphae genera
Cosmopolitan spiders